"Ketchup Song" is a song written and recorded by Canadian country music artist Stompin' Tom Connors.

The song debuted at number 39 on the RPM Country Tracks chart on June 6, 1970. It peaked at number 1 on July 25, 1970.

Background and writing
According to Tom the song was written after he was approached by a policeman when he was hitchhiking through Leamington, Ontario, and was told to write "a nice loveable song about our nice loveable town of Leamington". Tom said the policeman had two belts on, one around his waist and one going from his waist to the shoulder.

Chart performance

References

1970 singles
Stompin' Tom Connors songs
Leamington, Ontario
Songs about Canada
1970 songs